The year 2007 is the 7th year in the history of World Extreme Cagefighting, a mixed martial arts promotion based in the United States. In 2007 WEC held 7 events beginning with, WEC 25: McCullough vs. Cope.

Title fights

Events list

WEC 25: McCullough vs. Cope

WEC 25: McCullough vs. Cope was an event held on January 20, 2007 at the Hard Rock Hotel and Casino in Las Vegas, Nevada.

Results

WEC 26: Condit vs. Alessio

WEC 26: Condit vs. Alessio was an event held on March 24, 2007 at the Hard Rock Hotel and Casino in Las Vegas, Nevada.

Results

WEC 27: Marshall vs. McElfresh

WEC 27: Marshall vs. McElfresh was an event held on May 12, 2007 at the Hard Rock Hotel and Casino in Las Vegas, Nevada.

Results

WEC 28: Faber vs. Farrar

WEC 28: Faber vs. Farrar was an event held on June 3, 2007 at the Hard Rock Hotel and Casino in Las Vegas, Nevada.

Results

WEC 29: Condit vs. Larson

WEC 29: Condit vs. Larson was an event held on August 5, 2007 at the Hard Rock Hotel and Casino in Las Vegas, Nevada.

Results

WEC 30: McCullough vs. Crunkilton

WEC 30: McCullough vs. Crunkilton was an event held on September 5, 2007 at the Hard Rock Hotel and Casino in Las Vegas, Nevada.

Results

WEC 31: Faber vs. Curran

WEC 31: Faber vs. Curran was an event held on December 12, 2007 at the Hard Rock Hotel and Casino in Las Vegas, Nevada.

Results

See also 
 World Extreme Cagefighting
 List of World Extreme Cagefighting champions
 List of WEC events

References

World Extreme Cagefighting events
2007 in mixed martial arts